Charles Ladd Thomas (October 21, 1871 – September 19, 1920) was an American football player and coach and newspaper reporter and editor.  A native of Omaha, Nebraska, Thomas enrolled at the University of Michigan, where he played at the guard position for the Michigan Wolverines football teams of 1891 and 1892.  After graduating from Michigan in 1893, Thomas returned to Nebraska, where he served as an assistant football coach at the University of Nebraska under Frank Crawford in 1893 and 1894.  In 1895, he took over as Nebraska's head football coach, posting a 6–3 record. In 1897, Thomas was the head football coach at Nebraska Wesleyan University.  From 1901 to 1902, he served as the head football coach at Arkansas, where he compiled a 9–8 record.

Nebraska
After Frank Crawford left Nebraska to go to the University of Texas in 1894, Thomas became the head coach for the 1895 season.  He remained the coach for one year and had a 6–3 record while winning a share of the Western Interstate University Football Association title.  Thomas took the Nebraska football team on its first long road trip with a game in Butte, Montana to play Butte's local athletic club.

Late life and death
Thomas later worked as a reporter and editor for the Omaha Daily Bee in his hometown of Omaha, Nebraska.  He died at his home in Omaha, on September 19, 1920, after suffering a paralytic stroke.

Head coaching record

References

External links
 

1871 births
1920 deaths
19th-century players of American football
20th-century American newspaper editors
American football guards
Arkansas Razorbacks football coaches
Baker Wildcats football coaches
Michigan Wolverines football players
Nebraska Cornhuskers football coaches
Nebraska Wesleyan Prairie Wolves football coaches
Editors of Nebraska newspapers
Sportspeople from Omaha, Nebraska
Coaches of American football from Nebraska
Players of American football from Nebraska